This is a list of composers of 20th-century classical music, sortable by name, year of birth, year of death, nationality, notable works, and remarks. It includes only composers of significant fame and importance. The style of the composer's music is given where possible, bearing in mind that some defy simple classification. Names are listed first by year of birth, then in alphabetical order within each year. The 20th-century is defined by the calendar rather than by any unifying characteristics of musical style or attitude, and is therefore not an era of the same order as the classical or romantic. However, the century can be divided into modern and postmodern eras that overlap and can be defined more by differences in attitude than style.

References

External links

 
20th century classical
Classical composers